Creation Box Films is a film production company based in London, United Kingdom producing both features films, short films and commercials.

History 
The company was founded in 2001 and remains headed up by Writer/ Director/ Producer Lincoln Fenner The film company's titles include a range of features, shorts, narratives, documentaries as well as series and commercial work. Creation Box Films have won and been nominated for awards from various parts of the world with screenings and premieres including New York's Times Square, Cannes, the Tribeca Film Center, Long Island, the Randwick Ritz, the Phoenix and the Piccadilly.

Filmography 

 Time Rewind (2020)
 The Fear of Beer (2020)
 Fame Us (2019)
 Paid In Full (2017)
 More 4 Me (2012)
 21st Century Men (series - 2006)
 Another Chance (2005)
 Candles at 3:30 (2002)

References 

Film production companies of the United Kingdom
Mass media companies established in 2001